The Payne County Courthouse is a historic courthouse located in Stillwater, Oklahoma. Built in 1917, it is constructed of red brick and stone. It was listed on the National Register of Historic Places in 1984. Its design is similar to the Tillman County Courthouse and the Okmulgee County Courthouse, both of which are also listed in the National Register.

References

Courthouses on the National Register of Historic Places in Oklahoma
Government buildings completed in 1917
Payne County, Oklahoma
County courthouses in Oklahoma
National Register of Historic Places in Payne County, Oklahoma